Dalovice is a municipality and village in Mladá Boleslav District in the Central Bohemian Region of the Czech Republic. It has about 300 inhabitants.

Administrative parts
The industrial zone of U Česany is an administrative part of Dalovice.

Geography
It lies in an agricultural landscape in the Jizera Table. The municipality is situated on the right bank of the Jizera River.

History
The first written mention of Dalovice is from 1398.

Economy
There is an industrial zone formed by buildings of the Technology and Development Centre of Škoda Auto. It was built on the site of a former textile factory in 2018.

Notable people
Miloslav Mansfeld (1912–1991), fighter pilot
Josef Ludl (1916–1998), footballer

References

External links

Villages in Mladá Boleslav District